Kim Byung-oh (born 26 June 1989) is a South Korean footballer who plays as forward.

Career
Kim played for CFR Cluj first half of 2012, but made no appearance. He returned to South Korea that summer and signed with Ulsan Hyundai Mipo. He joined Chungju Hummel in January 2015. In July 2022 Kim Byung-oh joined Chainat Hornbill in Thai League 2

References

External links 

1989 births
Living people
Association football forwards
South Korean footballers
South Korean expatriate footballers
South Korean expatriate sportspeople in Romania
CFR Cluj players
Ulsan Hyundai Mipo Dockyard FC players
FC Anyang players
Daejeon Korail FC players
Chungju Hummel FC players
Suwon FC players
Gimcheon Sangmu FC players
Busan IPark players
Jeonnam Dragons players
Liga I players
Korea National League players
K League 2 players
K League 1 players
Expatriate footballers in Romania